The White House, also known as Kauffman House, is a historic home located at Luray, Page County, Virginia.  It was built about 1760, and is a two-story, three-bay Rhenish stone house covered with stucco.  It has a two-room central-chimney plan, consisting of a kuche and stube, with a barrel-vaulted cellar and a large storage loft.

It was listed on the National Register of Historic Places in 2013.

References

Houses on the National Register of Historic Places in Virginia
Houses completed in 1760
Houses in Page County, Virginia
National Register of Historic Places in Page County, Virginia